Vrtop may refer to:

Mountains

Kosovo 
 Vrtop (peak); a mountain peak in the Kobilica massif

Serbia 
 The peak of Gramada (mountain)